Vasiljka Jezovšek (born 1971) is a German operatic soprano.

Career 
Born in Lauterbach in Hesse, Jezovšek studied singing with Klesie Kelly at the Hochschule für Musik und Tanz Köln and then acquired a master's degree in opera for a year with Valerie Masterson at the Royal Academy of Music of London. As a young singer, she perfected her singing with Margreet Honig in the Netherlands.

During her studies, she was already involved in many European festivals including the Festival of Flanders, the Dresden Music Festival and the BBC Proms of London. Jezovšek was a finalist in the 52nd Teatro Lirico of Spoleto opera competition. In 1998, she won a 3rd prize at the Riccardo Zondai of Rovereto competition and received the special prize for the best performance of Mozart at the Klagenfurt theatre.

This artist has given, among other things, concerts with ensembles dedicated to early music. She undertakes international tours where she sings under the direction of renowned conductors: Iván Fischer, Robin Gritton, Helmuth Rilling and Wolfgang Schäfer, Thomas Hengelbrock (Haydn's Die Schöpfung at the Schleswig-Holstein Musik Festival), Philippe Herreweghe (Bach's Cantata BWV 105 at the BBC Proms of London). Jezovšek performs in concerts at European venues such as the Concertgebouw of Amsterdam, the Royal Albert Hall of London, the Schauspielhaus of Berlin and the Musikhalle of Hamburg. She has participated in tours with the Dresdner Kreuzchor and the Collegium Vocale Gent.

Jezovšek's extensive repertoire, recorded on many CDs, includes 17th and 18th century composers such as Bach, Handel and Mozart and also French and German Romantic music. She performs  contemporary music with the Mutare Ensemble of Frankfurt. For Hesse radio and Radio France she has sung lieder by Schubert and Beethoven.

In opera, she has performed the title role of Handel's Deidamia, and that of Eurydice in Monteverdi's L'Orfeo. She played Michal in the oratorio Saül at the Handel Festival of Halle.

Recordings (selection) 
 1990 Endimione (Cappella Coloniensis) - Conductor Bruno Weil - Deutsche Harmonia Mundi - ASIN: B00000E6WD
 BWV 57, BWV 57, BWV 110, BWV 122, BWV 138 - Conductor Philippe Herreweghe

Sources 
 Vasiljka Jezovšek on Bach-cantatas.com

References

External links 
 1 BCA010 BWV110 Cantata for 1st Day of Christmas (Philippe Herreweghe) (YouTube)
 BWV 57, Selig ist der Mann (Philippe Herreweghe) (YouTube)

1971 births
Living people
People from Lauterbach, Hesse
German operatic sopranos
Musicians from Hesse